Azoarepur is a village in Pindra Tehsil of Varanasi district in the Indian state of Uttar Pradesh. The village falls under the Sarvipur gram panchayat. The village is about 39 kilometres northwest of Varanasi city, 284 kilometres southeast of the state capital Lucknow, and 789 kilometres southeast of the national capital Delhi.

Demography
Azoarepur has a total population of 222 people amongst 37 families. The sex ratio of the village is 1,000, and the child sex ratio is 778. The Uttar Pradesh state average for both ratios is 912 and 902 respectively .

Transportation
Azoarepur can be accessed by road and does not have a railway station of its own. The closest railway station to this village is Pindra railway station (17 kilometres northeast). The nearest operational airports are Varanasi airport (15 kilometres east) and Allahabad Airport (128 kilometres west).

See also

Pindra Tehsil
Pindra (Assembly constituency)

Notes
  All demographic data is based on 2011 Census of India.

References 

Villages in Varanasi district